Öja is a populated area, a socken (not to be confused with parish), on the Swedish island of Gotland. It comprises the same area as the administrative Öja District, established on 1January 2016.

Geography 
Öja is situated partly on the narrow southern isthmus that connects the Storsudret peninsula to Gotland and partly on the peninsula itself. The medieval Öja Church is located in the socken. The locality Burgsvik is in the west part of Öja. , Öja Church belongs to Hoburg parish in Sudrets pastorat, along with the churches in Hamra, Vamlingbo, Sundre and Fide.

One of the asteroids in the asteroid belt, 10123 Fideöja, is named after this place and the neighboring Fide socken.

Öjamadonnan 

The Catholic statue was removed from the Öja Church during the Swedish Reformation and stowed away in a woodshed. It was later retrieved by Gotland Museum, renovated in 1948 and it is now displayed in the museum. A replica of the statue for Öja Church, was later made by sculptor Bertil Nyström. The sculpture has been chosen as one of the Treasured Objects in Sweden.

References

External links 

Objects from Öja at the Digital Museum by Nordic Museum

Populated places in Gotland County